Catlow is a 1971 western film.

Catlow may also refer to:

People
 Agnes Catlow, British science writer
 Charles Catlow, English cricketer
 Richard Catlow, British chemist

Places
 Catlow Valley (Oregon)
 Rock Creek (Catlow Valley)

Other
 Catlow Theater